Mateo Messina is an American composer perhaps best known for his soundtrack to the 2007 film Juno. The film won a Grammy Award for Best Compilation Soundtrack Album for Motion Picture, Television, or Other Visual Media.

Messina has scored over 50 feature films, short films, documentaries, and over 150 television episodes.

Early life
Growing up in Seattle, Messina was drawn to music and started playing piano at the age of three. He began composing early, premiering his first symphony at 23. He’s since written a total of 17 symphonies for LUMA Guild, with the proceeds of each premiere benefiting families at Seattle Children’s Hospital (totaling more than $1 million to date). He moved into writing music for film and television, stating that it is “like going to a different summer camp six to eight times every year. Each has its own style, its own discipline, shape, tone, characters, etc. You collaborate and move a mountain with a group of inspired people.”

Career
Messina’s diverse musical styles has been heard in film and on television alike. His provided a folksy, guitar-led score for Jason Reitman’s Juno, contributing to soundtrack album’s Grammy win. He lifted the spirits of the dramedy The Angriest Man in Brooklyn. His turned to funk-flavored music for the dark comedy Butter, and muzak versions of ’90s hits for Young Adult. Messina’s most recent work includes the action comedy Barely Lethal.

Messina regularly works on Reitman’s films; in addition to Juno and Young Adult, he contributed to Thank You For Smoking and Up in the Air, the R-rated comedy Life Happens, and the sports drama From the Rough.

Messina’s television work includes the comedy series Growing Up Fisher, the high-seas adventure Crossbones, lawyer comedy Fairly Legal, the mini-series Harley and the Davidsons, and the series Perfect Couples. Messina is currently working on season 3 of Jason Reitman’s comedy series Casual, as well as season 2 of the comedy, Superstore. He will also be coming back for a second season of the political comedy, Graves.

Works
Messina is known for frequently collaborating with composer Rolfe Kent having provided additional music for Up in the Air (uncredited) and Young Adult. Messina also provided source music as well as arranged Sanford and Son Theme for August: Osage County featuring original score by Gustavo Santaolalla. As well, he has written additional music for such hits as Up in the Air, Thank You for Smoking, Young Adult, and NBC's hit, The Office. Also, since the age of 23, Mateo has written, produced, and premiered 15 symphonies. Each premiere has been a benefit concert for families at Seattle Children's Hospital. To date, he and his team have raised over $1,000,000 for these children and their families. His recent works include The Angriest Man in Brooklyn, A Case of You, Butter, Best Man Down, Life Happens, 3,2,1... Frankie Go Boom, And While We Were Here, &  The Story of Luke.

References

External links
 
 
 
 The Symphony Guild

1972 births
American film score composers
Living people
American male film score composers